Love Australia or Leave was a far-right Australian political party. The party was founded by Kim Vuga, who is still the head. The party platform includes opposition to mass immigration and Islam in Australia, and support of Australia leaving the United Nations.

The party was founded in 2016 by Kim Vuga who had appeared in a television documentary in 2015 called Go Back to Where You Came From which sought to expose ordinary Australians to the situations faced by refugees and asylum seekers.

The party was registered in October 2016. Its founder Kim Vuga unsuccessfully stood for election in the federal election in July 2016 as an independent candidate to represent Queensland in the Australian Senate. She used the slogan "Love Australia or Leave" which has become the name of her party. It intended to be registered and stand candidates in the 2017 Queensland state election, but did not field any candidates at that election. 

In 2017, Kim Vuga along with other far-right groups falsely circulated the claim that Australia's first female Muslim MP, Dr Anne Aly had refused to lay a wreath at an Anzac Day ceremony in Perth. Dr Aly stated it was obvious why she was being targeted by the group. Kim later apologised via Facebook for spreading the rumour.

The party ran candidates at the 2019 Australian federal election: one for the lower house seat of Fisher, two Senate candidates (Vuga and Gavin Wyatt) in Queensland, and one ungrouped Senate candidate in each of New South Wales and Tasmania. 

The party was de-registered on 12 January 2022 by the Australian Electoral Commission for failing to meet the increased registration requirement of 1500 members.

Federal parliament

References

External links 
  

Defunct political parties in Australia
Australian nationalist parties
Anti-immigration politics in Australia
Criticism of multiculturalism
Anti-Islam sentiment in Australia
Australian nationalism
Far-right political parties in Australia